24th Transport Squadron may refer to:
 The 24th Fighter-Bomber Squadron, designated the 24th Transport Squadron (later 24th Troop Carrier Squadron) from February to July 1942
 The 924th Air Refueling Squadron, designated the 24th Transport Squadron (earlier 24th Ferrying Squadron) from March to October 9143